This is a list of members of the Western Australian Legislative Council from 22 May 1950 to 21 May 1952. The chamber had 30 seats made up of ten provinces each electing three members, on a system of rotation whereby one-third of the members would retire at each biennial election.

Several of the provinces were renamed at the election. The Electoral Districts Act 1947 had obviated the need for Parliament to redistribute seats itself, instead appointing three Electoral Commissioners who were to review the boundaries according to certain defined criteria. The redistribution was gazetted on 21 December 1948, but did not come into effect until 22 May 1950.

The changes of names were as follows:

 Central Province → Midland Province
 East Province → Central Province
 Metropolitan-Suburban Province → Suburban Province
 South Province → South-East Province
 South-East Province → South Province

Notes
 On 2 March 1950, Central (formerly East) Province Country MLC Charles Baxter died. His son Norm Baxter won the resulting by-election on 6 May 1950.
 On 10 March 1951, South-West Province Liberal MLC Hobart Tuckey died. Liberal candidate Charles Henning won the resulting by-election on 2 June 1951.
 On 22 April 1951, South-West Province Liberal MLC William Mann died. Liberal candidate James Murray won the resulting by-election on 2 June 1951.
 On 3 January 1952, Central (formerly East) Province Country MLC Garnet Barrington Wood died. Country Party candidate Leslie Diver won the resulting by-election on 3 May 1952.

Sources
 
 
 
 

Members of Western Australian parliaments by term